Makosi Musambasi is a Zimbabwean model, socialite and television personality. She appeared on Big Brother 6 in the UK in 2005.

Background
Makosi was born in 1980 in Zimbabwe. She lived her early life in Harare where she had her primary and secondary education then moved to the United Kingdom in 1999, she attained a nursing degree at University of Luton and a diploma in Journalism from EMDI in Dubai.

Makosi rose to prominence in 2005 when she became the first African to participate in a Big Brother reality show when she contested as a housemate in Big Brother 6 UK. After leaving Big Brother 6, Makosi presented music shows on MTV and Ben TV, she made cameo appearances on several television shows including 8 Out of 10 Cats in 2005, E4 zombie thriller Dead Set in 2008 and British comedy thriller Cash and Curry. In 2010 Makosi participated in the Ultimate Big Brother series. In 2012 Makosi returned to Zimbabwe where she launched a talk show called Makosi Today which aired on ZBC TV weekly in 2014 and is currently broadcast in Nigeria. In 2013 She authored a book titled Love Yourself, The Ultimate Choice.

Makosi is the founder of Africa Media Inc and she was recognised with Media Personality of the Year award by Zimbabwe International Women Awards. She also founded Be your Sister’s Keeper Foundation which she launched in 2014.

See also
List of Big Brother (British TV series) housemates

References

External links
Makosi IDMb

Living people
1980 births
Big Brother (British TV series) contestants